John Samuel Waters Jr. (born April 22, 1946) is an American filmmaker, writer, actor, and artist. He rose to fame in the early 1970s for his transgressive cult films, including Multiple Maniacs (1970), Pink Flamingos (1972) and Female Trouble (1974). He wrote and directed the comedy film Hairspray (1988), which was an international success and was later adapted into a hit Broadway musical. He has written and directed other films, including Polyester (1981), Cry-Baby (1990), Serial Mom (1994), Pecker (1998), and Cecil B. Demented (2000). His films contain elements of post-modern comedy and surrealism.

As an actor, Waters has appeared in Sweet and Lowdown (1999), Seed of Chucky (2004), 'Til Death Do Us Part (2007), Excision (2012), and Suburban Gothic (2014). More recently, he performs in his touring one-man show This Filthy World. He often worked with actor and drag queen Divine and his regular cast of the Dreamlanders.

Waters also works as a visual artist and across different media, such as installations, photography, and sculpture. In 2016, he received an honorary degree from the Maryland Institute College of Art. The audiobooks he narrated for his books Carsick and Mr. Know-It-All were nominated for the Grammy Award for Best Spoken Word Album in 2015 and 2020, respectively. In 2018, Waters was named an officer of the Order of Arts and Letters in France.

Early life
Waters was born April 22, 1946, in Baltimore, Maryland, one of four children born to Patricia Ann (née Whitaker) and John Samuel Waters, a manufacturer of fire-protection equipment. He was raised Roman Catholic by his mother, though his father was not. Through his mother, who immigrated to the United States from Victoria, British Columbia, Canada as a child, he is the great-great-great-grandson of George Price Whitaker of the Whitaker iron family. Waters grew up in Lutherville, Maryland, a suburb of Baltimore. His boyhood friend and muse, Glenn Milstead, later known as Divine, also lived in Lutherville. Waters lived at 313 Morris Avenue in Lutherville from his early teenage years until he moved out in his early twenties. Waters and Milstead shot many of their early films at the house, dubbing the front lawn the “Dreamland Lot”.

The film Lili inspired an interest in puppets in the seven-year-old Waters, who proceeded to stage violent versions of Punch and Judy for children's birthday parties. Biographer Robrt L. Pela says that Waters's mother believes the puppets in Lili had the greatest influence on Waters's subsequent career (though Pela believes tacky films at a local drive-in, which the young Waters watched from a distance through binoculars, had a greater effect).

Cry-Baby was also a product of Waters's boyhood, because of his fascination as a seven-year-old with the "drapes" then receiving intense news coverage because of the murder of Carolyn Wasilewski, a young "drapette", and his admiration for a young man living across the street who had a hot rod.

Waters was privately educated at the Calvert School in Baltimore. After attending Towson Jr. High School in Towson, Maryland, and Calvert Hall College High School in nearby Towson, he graduated from Boys' Latin School of Maryland. While still a teen, he made frequent trips into downtown Baltimore to visit Martick's, a beatnik bar, where he and Milstead met many of their later film collaborators. He was underage and couldn't enter the bar proper, but loitered in the adjacent alley, where he relied on the kindness of patrons to slip him drinks.

Career

Early career
Waters's first short film was Hag in a Black Leather Jacket.

MGM's The Wizard of Oz (1939) had a profound effect on Waters' creative mind, He said about it:

I was always drawn to forbidden subject matter in the very, very beginning. The Wizard of Oz opened me up because it was one of the first movies I ever saw. It opened me up to villainy, to screenwriting, to costumes. And great dialogue. I think the witch has great, great dialogue.

Waters has stated that he takes an equal amount of joy and influence from high-brow "art" films and sleazy exploitation films.

In January 1966, Waters and some friends were caught smoking marijuana on the grounds of NYU, and he was soon kicked out of his dormitory. He returned to Baltimore, where he completed his next two short films, Roman Candles and Eat Your Makeup. They were followed by the feature-length films Mondo Trasho and Multiple Maniacs.

Waters's films became Divine's primary star vehicles. All of Waters's early films were shot in the Baltimore area with his company of local actors, the Dreamlanders—which, in addition to Divine, included Mink Stole, Cookie Mueller, Edith Massey, David Lochary, Mary Vivian Pearce, Susan Walsh, and others. Waters met Edith Massey while she was a bartender at Pete's Hotel.

Waters's early campy movies present exaggerated characters in outrageous situations with hyperbolic dialogue. Pink Flamingos, Female Trouble and Desperate Living, which he labeled the Trash Trilogy, pushed hard at the boundaries of conventional propriety and censorship.

Move toward the mainstream

Waters's 1981 film Polyester starred Divine opposite former teen idol Tab Hunter. It was the first time that Waters was not the primary camera operator for his own work, as he had started collaborating with local film student David Insley. Since then, his films have become less controversial and more mainstream, although works such as Hairspray, Cry-Baby, Serial Mom, Pecker and Cecil B. Demented still retain his trademark inventiveness. Hairspray, the last film he produced, became a hit Broadway musical that swept the 2003 Tony Awards; and a film adaptation of the Broadway musical was released in theaters on July 20, 2007 to positive reviews and commercial success. Cry-Baby, itself a musical, also became a Broadway musical.

In 2004, the NC-17-rated A Dirty Shame marked a return to Waters' earlier, more controversial work of the 1970s. Currently, it is the most recent film he directed.

In 2007, Waters became the host ("The Groom Reaper") of 'Til Death Do Us Part, a program on America's Court TV network.

In 2008, he planned to make a children's Christmas film, Fruitcake starring Johnny Knoxville and Parker Posey. Filming was set for November 2008, but the project was shelved in January 2009. In 2010, Waters told the Chicago Tribune that "Independent films that cost $5 million are very hard to get made. I sold the idea, got a development deal, got paid a great salary to write it—and now the company is no longer around, which is the case with many independent film companies these days."

In October 2022, it was announced that Waters will adapt his novel, Liarmouth, into a film. Village Roadshow Pictures will produce, and Waters will write and direct.

Waters has often created characters with alliterated names for his films, such as Corny Collins, Cuddles Kovinsky, Donald and Donna Dasher, Dawn Davenport, Fat Fuck Frank, Francine Fishpaw, Link Larkin, Motormouth Maybelle, Mole McHenry, Penny and Prudy Pingleton, Ramona Ricketts, Sandy Sandstone, Sylvia Stickles, Todd Tomorrow, Tracy Turnblad, Ursula Udders, Wade Walker and Wanda Woodward.

Other ventures 

Waters is a bibliophile, with a collection of over 8,000 books. In 2011, during a visit to the Waters house in Baltimore, Andrew Edgecliffe-Johnson observed:

Bookshelves line the walls but they are not enough. The coffee table, desk and side tables are heaped with books, as is the replica electric chair in the hall. They range from Taschen art tomes such as The Big Butt Book to Jean Genet paperbacks and a Hungarian translation of Tennessee Williams with a pulp fiction cover. In one corner sits a doll from the horror spoof Seed of Chucky, in which Waters appeared. It feels like an eccentric professor's study, or a carefully curated exhibition based on the life of a fictional character. 

Waters has had his fan mail delivered to Atomic Books, an independent bookstore in Baltimore, for over 20 years.

Puffing constantly on a cigarette, Waters appeared in a short film, shown in film art houses, announcing that "no smoking is permitted" in the theaters. The spot was directed by Douglas Brian Martin and produced by Douglas Brian Martin and Steven M. Martin. They also created two other short films, for the Nuart Theatre (a Landmark Theater) in West Los Angeles, California, in appreciation for their showing Pink Flamingos for many years. It is shown immediately before any of Waters' films, and before the midnight showing of The Rocky Horror Picture Show.

Waters played a minister in Blood Feast 2: All U Can Eat, directed by Herschell Gordon Lewis.

Waters is a board member of the Maryland Film Festival, and has selected and hosted a favorite film there each year since its launch in 1999. He is also on the advisory board of the Provincetown International Film Festival, and has hosted events and presented awards there every year since it was founded in 1999.

He is a contributor to Artforum magazine and author of its year-end Top Ten Films list.

Waters hosts an annual performance, "A John Waters Christmas", which was launched in 1996 at the Castro Theatre in San Francisco, and in 2018 toured 17 cities over 23 days.

In 2014, Waters began hosting an annual "Camp John Waters" event in Kent, Connecticut. Adult fans from as far away as Australia and Chile "relive their sleepaway camping days" with an "extra-campy theme weekend." Notable guests have included Debbie Harry, Patricia Hearst, Kathleen Turner, Mink Stole and Randy Harrison.

In 2019, the Film Society of Lincoln Center celebrated its 50th anniversary at a gala where John Waters spoke in tribute to the Center along with Martin Scorsese, Dee Rees, Pedro Almodovar, Tilda Swinton, Jake Gyllenhaal, Michael Moore, Paul Dano and Zoe Kazan.

Fine art
Since the early 1990s, Waters has been making photo-based artwork and installations that have been internationally exhibited in galleries and museums. In 2004, the New Museum in New York City presented a retrospective of his artwork curated by Marvin Heiferman and Lisa Phillips. His most recent exhibition John Waters: Indecent Exposure was exhibited at the Baltimore Museum of Art from October 2018 to January 2019 and later traveled to the Wexner Center for the Arts. Prior to that, Waters exhibited Rear Projection in April 2009, at the Marianne Boesky Gallery in New York and the Gagosian Gallery in Los Angeles. Waters has been represented by C. Grimaldis Gallery in Baltimore, Maryland, since 2002 and by Marianne Boesky Gallery in New York since 2006.
Waters's pieces are often comical, such as Rush (2009), a super-sized, tipped-over bottle of poppers (nitrite inhalants), and Hardy Har (2006), a photograph of flowers that squirts water at anyone who traverses a taped line on the floor. Waters has characterized his art as conceptual: "The craft is not the issue here. The idea is. And the presentation."

In November 2020 Waters promised to donate 372 artworks from his personal collection,
including some of his own work as well as pieces by 125 artists, including Andy Warhol, Roy Lichtenstein, Cy Twombly, Cindy Sherman and more, to the Baltimore Museum of Art. In recognition of the donation, the museum named its rotunda after Waters, but Waters also insisted the museum name an all-gender bathroom after him. Both the rotunda and the bathroom were renamed for Waters in time for the opening of the first exhibition of his bequeathed collection, Coming Attractions: The John Waters Collection on November 20, 2022. Waters, who serves on the museum’s board of directors, has stated the museum will fully acquire all of his art after his death.

Carsick
With the motif "My life is so over-scheduled, what will happen if I give up control?", Waters completed a hitchhiking journey across the United States from Baltimore to San Francisco, turning his adventures into a book titled Carsick. On May 15, 2012, while on the hitchhiking trip, Waters was picked up by 20-year-old Myersville, Maryland, councilman Brett Bidle, who thought Waters was a homeless hitchhiker standing in the pouring rain. Feeling bad for Waters, he agreed to drive him four hours to Ohio.

The next day, indie rock band Here We Go Magic tweeted that they had picked John Waters up hitchhiking in Ohio. He was wearing a hat with the text "Scum of the Earth". In Denver, Colorado, Waters reconnected with Bidle (who had made an effort to catch up with him); Bidle then drove him another  to Reno, Nevada. Before parting ways, Waters arranged for Bidle to stay at his San Francisco apartment: "I thought, you know what, he wanted an adventure, too ... He's the first Republican I'd ever vote for."

Bidle later said: "We are polar opposites when it comes to our politics, religious beliefs. But that's what I loved about the whole trip. It was two people able to agree to disagree and still move on and have a great time. I think that's what America's all about."

Personal life

Although he maintains apartments in New York City and (since 2008) in San Francisco's Nob Hill, as well as a summer home in Provincetown, Waters mainly resides in Baltimore. All his films are set and shot there. He is recognizable by his trademark pencil moustache.

An openly gay man, Waters is an avid supporter of gay rights and gay pride. In a 2019 interview, he said that he dislikes publicly discussing his personal life, adding that he had a partner but that they both preferred to keep the relationship private.

Waters was a great fan of the music of Little Richard when growing up. He has said that, ever since he shoplifted a copy of the Little Richard song "Lucille" in 1957, at the age of 11, "I've wished I could somehow climb into Little Richard's body, hook up his heart and vocal cords to my own, and switch identities." In 1987, Playboy magazine employed Waters, then aged 41, to interview his idol, but the interview did not go well, with Waters later remarking: "It turned into kind of a disaster."

In 2009, Waters advocated the parole of former Manson family member Leslie Van Houten. He devotes a chapter to Van Houten in his book Role Models (2010).

Throughout his life, Waters has been open about his recreational drug use, including marijuana and LSD, particularly in regards to his creative process. Waters began using LSD as a teenager, “tak[ing] LSD and see[ing]…movies all the time”. Waters was often on LSD while making his early films, claiming in a 2016 interview “I was on LSD [during Multiple Maniacs], I don’t remember [how long it took to shoot the film]!” Even in his 70s, Waters used LSD recreationally. In 2022, Waters said that if he were to write his younger self a letter, he would say “quit smoking [cigarettes] and do everything else”. Waters quit smoking around 2004, saying “the only thing I’ve ever regretted in my whole life [was] smoking cigarettes. Because it was a nightmare giving up. It’s the only thing the government ever told me that was true: It does kill you!”

Filmography

As actor

Television

Documentary appearances

 American Cinema
 The Andy Warhol Diaries (TV series)
 Beautiful Darling
 Biography
 Celebrity Ghost Stories
 The Cockettes
 Divine Waters
 Divine Trash
 The Drexel Interview
 I Am Divine
 Love Letter to Edie
 E! True Hollywood Story
 Fabulous! The Story of Queer Cinema
 Le Grand Journal (Canal+)
 Guest of Cindy Sherman
 HBO's First Look
 Here's Looking At You, Boy The Coming Out of Queer Cinema
 How Porn Conquered the World
 The Incredibly Strange Film Show
 Inside Deep Throat
 Intimate Portrait
 It Came From Kuchar
 Little Castles
 Mansome
 Midnight Movies: From the Margin to the Mainstream
 Of Dolls and Murder
 Pie in the Sky: The Brigid Berlin Story
 Queens of Disco (BBC Four)
 SexTV
 Tab Hunter Confidential
 The Simpsons 20th Anniversary Special In 3-D! On Ice!
 That Man: Peter Berlin
 This Film Is Not Yet Rated
 Tracks
 VH1 Behind the Music (Blondie)
 William S. Burroughs: A Man Within

Other credits
 This Filthy World Waters's touring one-man show, made into a feature film directed by Jeff Garlin
 A John Waters Christmas A CD of Christmas songs compiled by Waters
 Mommie Dearest (1981) Audio commentary on film's "Hollywood Royalty Edition" DVD release (2006)
 The Little Mermaid Special Edition DVD (2006) Interview on 'making of' documentary about Howard Ashman, the theatre (i.e. Little Shop of Horrors), and the inspiration behind the character Ursula: Divine
 A Date with John Waters (2007), a CD collection of songs Waters finds romantic
 Christmas Evil DVD release (2006) Audio commentary
 Breaking Up with John Waters Waters's third CD compilation is currently in the works
 The Other Hollywood Commentary and opinions about pornography throughout the book
 "The Creep" (featuring Nicki Minaj) Appeared on a television set in The Lonely Island's music video "The Creep", which made its debut on Saturday Night Live. Waters gives the introduction to the song and he is credited as a featured artist on the album.
 Art:21 Introducing Host for Season Two, "Stories" episode PBS DVD series

Published works 
 
 
 
 
 
 
 Waters, John (2019). Mr. Know-It-All: The Tarnished Wisdom of a Filth Elder. New York: Farrar, Straus and Giroux. .

 Novel
 Waters, John (2022). Liarmouth: A Feel-Bad Romance. New York: Farrar, Straus and Giroux. ISBN 9780374185725.

 Screenplays
 
 

 Photo collections

Awards and nominations 
In 1999, Waters was honored with the Filmmaker on the Edge Award at the Provincetown International Film Festival. In September 2015, the British Film Institute ran a programme to celebrate 50 years of Waters films which included all of his early films, some previously unscreened in the UK.

In 2014, Waters was nominated for a Grammy for the spoken word version of his book, Carsick. His follow-up record, Make Trouble, was produced by Grammy-winning producer, Ian Brennan, and released on Jack White's Third Man Records in the fall of 2017.

In 2016, Waters received an honorary degree from the Maryland Institute College of Art in Baltimore during the college's undergraduate commencement ceremony. In 2018, Waters was named an Officier of the Ordre des Arts et des Lettres, a cultural award from the French government.

See also 
 LGBT culture in New York City
 List of self-identified LGBTQ New Yorkers

References

Citations

General bibliography

Further reading

External links

 
 Dreamland News site including current news, online archive, filmography, books and history

 
1946 births
Living people
20th-century American artists
20th-century American male actors
20th-century American male writers
20th-century American non-fiction writers
21st-century American artists
21st-century American male actors
21st-century American male writers
21st-century American non-fiction writers
21st-century American novelists
American bibliophiles
American gay actors
American gay writers
American LGBT novelists
American male screenwriters
American people of Canadian descent
American people of English descent
Artists from Baltimore
Calvert Hall College High School alumni
Culture of Baltimore
Film directors from Maryland
Film theorists
American gay artists
LGBT film directors
LGBT people from Maryland
American LGBT rights activists
American LGBT screenwriters
Male actors from Baltimore
Maryland Democrats 
New York University alumni
Novelists from Maryland
Officiers of the Ordre des Arts et des Lettres
People from Lutherville, Maryland
Whitaker iron family
Writers from Baltimore
Postmodernist filmmakers